Thomas Alfred Thompson (August 5, 1868 – May 12, 1953) was a farmer and political figure in Ontario, Canada. He represented Lanark North in the Legislative Assembly of Ontario from 1923 to 1929 and Lanark in the House of Commons of Canada from 1930 to 1940 as a Conservative member.

He was born in Ramsay Township, Ontario, the son of George Thompson. In 1897, he married Elizabeth W. Morris. He served two years as reeve for the township. He also was a public school trustee and was township clerk and treasurer for 20 years. Thompson ran unsuccessful for a federal seat in 1929. He was unsuccessful in a bid for reelection in 1940.

References 
 Canadian Parliamentary Guide, 1930, AL Normandin

External links 

1868 births
1953 deaths
Conservative Party of Canada (1867–1942) MPs
Members of the House of Commons of Canada from Ontario
Progressive Conservative Party of Ontario MPPs